Podolí may refer to the following places in the Czech Republic:

 Podolí (Brno-Country District)
 Podolí (Přerov District)
 Podolí (Uherské Hradiště District)
 Podolí (Vsetín District)
 Podolí (Žďár nad Sázavou District)
 Podolí I
 Podolí (Prague)
 Bílé Podolí